Octarrhena, commonly known as grub orchids, is a genus of flowering plants from the orchid family, Orchidaceae. Plants in this genus are small, orchids with short stems, thin roots, short, thick, fleshy leaves arranged in two ranks and tiny flowers. The labellum is rigidly attached to the base of the column. There are  about fifty species native to areas from Sri Lanka and Malesia to the Western Pacific.

Description
Orchids in the genus Octarrhena are small epiphytic, lithophytic or terrestrial herbs with thin roots and short stems with short, thick, fleshy leaves, their bases sheathing the stem. A large number of tiny, usually white, cream-coloured, yellowish or greenish flowers are arranged on a flowering stem arising from a leaf axil. The sepals and petals are free from each other, the petals usually much smaller than the sepals. The labellum is small, unlobed, rigidly fixed to the column and lacks a spur.

Taxonomy and naming
The genus Octarrhena was first formally described in 1861 by George Henry Kendrick Thwaites who published the description in Enumeratio plantarum Zeylaniae. The name Octarrhena is derived from the Ancient Greek words okto meaning "eight" and arrhen meaning "male" or "masculine", referring the eight free pollinia in the anther.

Species list
The following is a list of species of Octarrhena recognised by the World Checklist of Selected Plant Families as at January 2019:

 Octarrhena amesiana Schltr.
 Octarrhena angraecoides (Schltr.) Schltr.
 Octarrhena angustifolia (Schltr.) Schuit.
 Octarrhena angustissima (Schltr.) Schuit.
 Octarrhena aporoides (Schltr.) Schuit.
 Octarrhena aristata P.Royen
 Octarrhena bilabrata (P.Royen) W.Kittr.
 Octarrhena brassii (L.O.Williams) Schuit.
 Octarrhena calceiformis (J.J.Sm.) P.Royen
 Octarrhena celebica Schltr.
 Octarrhena cladophylax (Rchb.f.) P.F.Hunt
 Octarrhena cordata P.Royen
 Octarrhena cucullifera J.J.Sm.
 Octarrhena cupulilabra P.Royen
 Octarrhena cylindrica J.J.Sm
 Octarrhena cymbiformis J.J.Sm.
 Octarrhena elmeri (Ames) Ames
 Octarrhena ensifolia (Ames) Schltr.
 Octarrhena exigua Schltr.
 Octarrhena falcifolia (Schltr.) Schuit.
 Octarrhena filiformis (L.O.Williams) P.Royen
 Octarrhena filiformis var. brachyphylla (L.O.Williams) P.Royen
 Octarrhena filiformis var. filiformis
 Octarrhena filiformis var. glabra P.Royen
 Octarrhena firmula Schltr.
 Octarrhena gemmifera Ames
 Octarrhena gibbosa J.J.Sm.
 Octarrhena goliathensis J.J.Sm.
 Octarrhena gracilis (L.O.Williams) Schuit.
 Octarrhena hastipetala J.J.Sm.
 Octarrhena latipetala (J.J.Sm.) Schuit.
 Octarrhena lorentzii J.J.Sm.
 Octarrhena macgregorii (Schltr.) Schltr.
 Octarrhena mendumiana Schuit. & de Vogel
 Octarrhena miniata (Schltr.) Schltr.
 Octarrhena minuscula Aver. & Duy
 Octarrhena oberonioides (Schltr.) Schltr.
 Octarrhena obovata (J.J.Sm.) P.Royen
 Octarrhena parvula Thwaites
 Octarrhena platyrachis P.Royen
 Octarrhena podochiloides (Schltr.) Schuit.
 Octarrhena purpureiocellata P.Royen
 Octarrhena pusilla (F.M.Bailey) Dockrill
 Octarrhena reflexa (J.J.Sm.) Schuit.
 Octarrhena saccolabioides (Schltr.) Schltr.
 Octarrhena salmonea P.Royen
 Octarrhena spathulata (Schltr.) Schuit.
 Octarrhena tenuis (J.J.Sm.) J.J.Sm.
 Octarrhena torricellensis Schltr..
 Octarrhena trigona (J.J.Sm.) P.Royen
 Octarrhena umbellulata Schltr.
 Octarrhena uniflora Schuit. & de Vogel
 Octarrhena vanvuurenii J.J.Sm.
 Octarrhena vitellina (Ridl.) Schltr.
 Octarrhena wariana Schltr.

Distribution
Orchids in the genus Octarrhena are found in Sri Lanka, Vietnam, Borneo, Java, Peninsular Malaysia, the Philippines, Sulawesi, Sumatra, the Bismarck Archipelago, New Guinea, the Solomon Islands, Queensland (Australia), Fiji, New Caledonia, Vanuatu and the Caroline Islands.

References

External links

 
Podochileae genera